The Bostwick School (also known as the Old Bostwick School) is a historic site in Bostwick, Florida, United States. It is located at 125 Tillman Street. On September 29, 1999, it was added to the U.S. National Register of Historic Places.

History
The school was built in 1921. It had two floors with the first floor having four rooms, with two classes in each room. The first floor was used for grades 1 through 8, and the second floor was used for assemblies. The school also had a stage with rooms on either side for a kitchen and a library. At the rear of the building were restrooms and a water trough. It remained in use until its closure in 1977.

The school has since been renovated and converted into the Bostwick Library, a branch of the Putnam County Library System. Renovation was completed on December 4, 2007.

References

External links

 Putnam County listings at National Register of Historic Places
 Bostwick Community Center at Florida's Office of Cultural and Historical Programs

National Register of Historic Places in Putnam County, Florida
Defunct schools in Florida